David Menkin is a Norwegian actor. His best known for his voice roles as Porter and Jack in the US dub of Thomas & Friends (2013–present) and as Virgil and Gordon Tracy in the 2015 reboot series Thunderbirds Are Go (2015–2020).

His other voice roles in animation and video games include Scoop and Travis in the US version of Bob the Builder, Dad Hooman in Floogals, Chuck in Space Chickens in Space, Munki and Rocky in Jungle Beat: The Movie, Malos in Xenoblade Chronicles 2, Captain Joseph Brady in Battlefield 3, Breach in Valorant, Magnus in Final Fantasy XIV: Shadowbringers, and Luke Skywalker in Lego Star Wars: The Skywalker Saga.

Early life
Menkin was born to a Norwegian mother and an American father in Moss, where he partially spent his childhood before the family moved to Benin to partake in Saga Petrolium's oil drilling in West Africa. In a 2018 radio interview, he stated that the bi-cultural upbringing made "a great impression" on him. As an adolescent, their family moved to London. He attended New York University and graduated in 1999 from Mountview Theatre School in London, where he still lives and works as an actor.

Career
In 2001, Menkin's acting career started where he was a minor character in the television movie Wit.

His film roles include A Hologram for the King, Octane, Zero Dark Thirty, Survivor, Arthur Christmas, The Man from U.N.C.L.E., Florence Foster Jenkins and the documentary Project Nim.

For many years he was provided the announcer voice for the Norwegian TV channel TV3.

He was a member of Thomas & Friends's voice cast from 2013 until 2021 where he voiced Porter and Jack in the US version. He also voiced Stanley for Season 19 only, which was passed on to Rob Rackstraw and John Schwab. He was also asked to voice the title role of Thomas for the US version after Martin Sherman's departure from the series, but he passed on the offer, citing support for Sherman, so it passed on to Joseph May instead. From 2015, he voiced Virgil and Gordon Tracy in the rebooted Thunderbirds Are Go television series. In 2017, Menkin provided the voice for Chuck, who was one of Space Chickens in Space'''s lead characters.

On the Norwegian TV series Lykkeland, Menkin plays Jackson. The series premiered on NRK and DR1 October 2018. Lykkeland won Best Script and Best Music at Canneseries in April of the same year. Menkin stated that his role on Lykkeland'' was his "first proper Norwegian acting job".

Personal life
He speaks English and Norwegian. Menkin is gay.

Filmography

Film

Television

Audiobooks

Video games

References

External links

Living people
American expatriates in England
American gay actors
American male film actors
American male television actors
American male video game actors
American male voice actors
American people of Norwegian descent
Male actors from London
Norwegian expatriates in England
Norwegian LGBT actors
Norwegian male film actors
Norwegian male television actors
Norwegian male video game actors
Norwegian male voice actors
Norwegian people of American descent
People educated at ACS International Schools
People from Moss, Norway
21st-century American male actors
21st-century Norwegian male actors
Year of birth missing (living people)